Grace Hopkinson Eliot Hall, often called Eliot Hall, is a historic dormitory building on the Radcliffe Quadrangle of Harvard University in Cambridge, Massachusetts. The four story neo-Georgian brick building was built in 1907 to a design by Alexander Wadsworth Longfellow, Jr.  It is a duplicate of Bertram Hall, which is adjacent, except some of its architectural details were simplified to reduce costs.  The house is named in honor of Grace Hopkinson Eliot, the wife of Harvard President Charles W. Eliot.  The building is now one of the dormitories of Cabot House.

The building was listed on the National Register of Historic Places in 1986.

See also
National Register of Historic Places listings in Cambridge, Massachusetts

References

External links
Cabot House

Harvard University buildings
University and college buildings on the National Register of Historic Places in Massachusetts
National Register of Historic Places in Cambridge, Massachusetts